The Hailufeng Soviet (i.e. Hai[feng]-Lufeng Soviet) was the first Chinese Soviet territory, established in November 1927, by Peng Pai with Ye Ting's remnant troops from the Nanchang Uprising. After the Little Long March and the near-rout at the Battle of Shantou these troops were much diminished and were directed by the ComIntern to lie low in the deep countryside and to avoid any further battles.

Location

The territory lay in mountainous Hakka speaking parts of Haifeng, Lufeng and Luhe counties of what is now Shanwei municipality on the coast of Guangdong Province.

See also
Chinese Soviet Republic

Notes and references

External links 

Former socialist republics
Political history of China
Chinese Civil War
History of Guangdong
States and territories established in 1927
1927 establishments in China
Communism in China